Belle Vue is an area of Manchester, England, east of the city centre, bordered by the Hope Valley Line on the east and the Glossop Line on the west. Belle Vue is part of the electoral ward of Longsight.   Belle Vue railway station lies on the Hope Valley Line.

In 1897, the machine tool manufacturer Kendall and Gent opened the Victoria Works. The company closed down in the late 1960s.

The area  is best known for the former Belle Vue Zoological Gardens and Belle Vue Stadium. The zoo opened in 1836 and in the 1870s a small amusements area was added which developed into a major amusement park in the 20th century. It occupied a 96-acre site and at the height of its popularity attracted 2,000,000 visitors annually.  In 1910 the Kings Hall was opened, housing The Hallé for several years and hosting major concerts over the years. The zoo closed in September 1977 due to mounting debts. The amusement park remained open on summer weekends until 1980. The land was sold in 1982, and the site finally cleared in 1987.

Belle Vue is currently home to the  National Basketball Performance Centre, headquarters of Basketball England. It the home arena of men's basketball team Manchester Giants, women's basketball team Manchester Mystics, and women's netball team Manchester Thunder.

References

Belle Vue